This is a list of bridges and tunnels on the National Register of Historic Places in the U.S. state of Michigan.  There are 98 bridges and 3 tunnels in this list.

See also

References

 
Michigan
Bridges
Bridges